was an old province in the area that is today Fukushima Prefecture and Miyagi Prefecture.

History
This iteration of Iwaki Province lasted for a brief period of time in Nara period. Established in 718 with the division of Mutsu Province, it was composed of the five districts of Iwaki (石城), Shineha (標葉), Namekata (行方), Uta (宇太), Watari (曰理) and Kikuta (菊多). Only Kikuta district was given from Hitachi Province. Abolished  and returned to Mutsu sometime between 722 and 724. Kikuta moved to Mutsu at that time.

See also
Iwaki Province (1868), brief reconstitution.

Notes

References
 Nussbaum, Louis-Frédéric and Käthe Roth. (2005).  Japan encyclopedia. Cambridge: Harvard University Press. ;  OCLC 58053128

Other websites

  Murdoch's map of provinces, 1903

Former provinces of Japan
States and territories established in the 710s
States and territories disestablished in the 8th century
718 establishments
724 disestablishments
8th century in Japan